The Church of Scientology is a 2000 book about the Church of Scientology by religious scholar J. Gordon Melton. It is the first of a series of books on new religious movements published by the Center for Studies on New Religions.

Summary
Melton deals with the history and development of Scientology, covering such matters as church's structure and organization, ethics, and nonprofit initiatives. He also deals with the church's views regarding religious freedom and human rights, as well as its members efforts to win their own religious freedom and human rights. He also deals with the question the Church itself has often been asked, whether it does qualify as a religion.

Reception
Derek Davis said in the Journal of Church and State, "Few books pack as much information into so little space." Catherine Ritchie called it a brief, well-balanced guide to the controversial movement, and a good choice for public libraries, in Library Journal. Jana Riess said in Publishers Weekly that it was a rare, welcome impartial treatment of the subject by an outsider and that it did an admirable job covering the bases and showing the views of both the Church and its detractors. In a review in the Marburg Journal of Religion,  argued that the book "err[s] on the side of too much politeness and hesitation when discussing critical questions posed by the public about Scientology".

References

2000 in religion
2000 non-fiction books
Books about Scientology
Books by J. Gordon Melton
English-language books
Signature Books books